Pavel Korchagin is a 1956 Soviet drama film directed by Aleksandr Alov and Vladimir Naumov, based on the novel How the Steel Was Tempered.

Plot 
The film tells about the Red Army soldier Pavel Korchagin and his comrades fighting for a just cause.

Cast 
 Vasily Lanovoy as Pavel Korchagin
 Tamara Stradina as Tonya Tumanova
 Elza Lezhdey as Rita Ustynovich
 Vladimir Marenkov as Ivan Zharky
 Pavel Usovnichenko as Zhukhrai
 Dmitri Milyutenko as Tokarev
 Aleksandr Lebedev as Nikolai Okunev
 Lev Perfilov as Franz Klavichek
 Viktor Stepanov as Vikhrasty
 Lidiya Piktorskaya as Korchagin's mother
 Konstantin Stepankov as Akim
Ada Rogovtseva as Christina
Valentina Telegina as moonshiner
Nikolai Grinko as station chekist
Yevgeny Morgunov as thief (uncredited)

References

External links 
 

1956 drama films
1956 films
Films based on Russian novels
Films directed by Aleksandr Alov
Films directed by Vladimir Naumov
Nikolai Ostrovsky
Russian Civil War films
1950s Russian-language films
1950s war drama films
Soviet war drama films
Soviet epic films